One Man and His Cow (original title: La Vache - The Cow) is a 2016 French comedy film directed by Mohamed Hamidi.

Plot
Fatah, a modest, cheerful and optimistic Algerian farmer who has never left his country, dreams of taking his cow Jacqueline to the Paris International Agricultural Show.

One day, to everyone's surprise, he receives an invitation to participate in the Paris show. He must then borrow money from all of the men of the village to complete his journey. He leaves his wife Naima and his two daughters and takes the boat to Marseille with his cow. But, having spent all his money to cross the Mediterranean, he is forced to walk to Paris. It is the start of a trip through France full of interesting encounters; Fatah finds himself repudiated by his brother-in-law, leading a slightly-too-inebriated village fair, being hosted by a bankrupt count, embroiled in a violent demonstration, is separated from Jacqueline, and finally jailed. Meanwhile, in his village, expectations rise and fall while the local mukhtar tries to make time with Naima, Fatah's wife, telling her her husband isn't coming home.

Spotted by the press, the brave walker and his cow become instant sensations on social media, provoking admiration and a few mockers. Despite difficulties, real dangers and despair, Fatah strives to reach the show in time to enter Jacqueline into the contest for the most beautiful Tarentaise cow...

Cast

 Fatsah Bouyahmed as Fatah
 Lambert Wilson as Philippe
 Jamel Debbouze as Hassan
 Ophélia Kolb as Stéphanie
 Christian Ameri as Lucien
 Fehd Benchemsi as Samir
 Abdellah Chakiri as Mokhtar
 Catherine Davenier as Jacqueline
 Brigitte Guedj as Brigitte
 Miloud Khetib as Hamé Hamed
 Karina Marimon as Cathy
 Hajar Masdouki as Naïma
 Charline Paul as Claire
 Thor Schenker as Armand
 Malik Bentalha as The young commuter
 Julia Piaton as The young reporter
 Cyril Hanouna as himself
 Anne-Sophie Lapix as herself
 Élise Lucet as herself

References

External links
 

2016 films
2010s comedy road movies
2010s French-language films
2010s Arabic-language films
2016 comedy films
French comedy road movies
Films about farmers
Films about cattle
2016 multilingual films
French multilingual films
2010s French films